Nyabira is a village in the province of Mashonaland West, Zimbabwe. It is located about 34 km north-west of Harare on the main road and railway line from Harare to Chinhoyi. The name Nyabira is the corrupted version of Nyavira, named after the Nyavira dynasty who lost their chieftainship to the colonial rulers when they created Little England and the other seven farms. Mixed farming and cattle breeding takes place in the area.

Populated places in Mashonaland East Province